Vehicle registration plates in Singapore are administered by the Land Transport Authority. All vehicles in Singapore are required to display front and back plates bearing its registration number. Purchasers of vehicles have the option to bid for a vehicle registration number or get a vehicle registration number automatically assigned. Vehicle registration numbers can be retained on new or old vehicles owned by the same person. Vehicle owners are also able to replace and bid for a new registration number for existing vehicles.

Current scheme

In general, every motor vehicle in Singapore requires a vehicle registration number to be displayed at the front center (in almost all cases or otherwise set by car manufacturer due to bumper constraints) and rear of the vehicle. Two colour schemes are in use: white-on-black scheme that is standard on cars from dealerships, or the Euro black-on-white (front of the vehicle) and black-on-yellow (rear) scheme, of which the number plate has to be made of a reflective plastic or metallic with textured characters which are black (for white-yellow), or white or silver (for black ones).

These plates are either represented in rectangular single line or squarish two line format. The number plate has to be made of a reflective plastic with flat characters or metallic with embossed characters which are black (for white-yellow), or white or silver (for black ones).

Although no standardised typeface is used, all typefaces are based on the Charles Wright number plate typeface that was and is still used in the UK. Rarely, the Arial Bold or FE-Schrift font used in Germany can be seen – though the use of these fonts is prohibited by the Land Transport Authority (LTA).

For motorists who would be attaching a bicycle rack of which the vehicle licence plate is blocked at the rear of a vehicle, or any other fittings such as wedding decorations that obstructs the view of the number plate, motorists are required to hang an additional licence plate prominently at the rear of the vehicle.

A typical vehicle registration number comes in the format Sxx #### y:

S – Vehicle class ("S", with some exceptions, stands for a private vehicle since 1984)
x – Alphabetical series ("I" and "O" are not used to avoid confusion with "1" and "0")
#### – Numerical series (from 1 to 9999, without leading zeroes)
y – Checksum letter ("F", "I", "N", "O", "Q", "V" and "W" are never used as checksum letters; absent on special government vehicle plates and events vehicle plates)

Types of numbers
Private car licence plate numbers began in the early 1900s when Singapore was one of the four Straits Settlements, with a single prefix S for denoting Singapore, then adding a suffix letter S 'B' to S 'Y' for cars, but skipping a few like S 'A' (reserved for motorcycles), S 'H' (reserved for taxis), S 'D' (reserved for municipal vehicles), and S 'G' for goods vehicles large and small. There was no checksum letter, for example, S. When the checksum letter was implemented, these plate numbers were given checksum letters as well, for example SG5999 became SG5999Z.

When 'S' was exhausted at SY, in January 1972, private cars started with E and Land Transport Authority begin to create separate vehicle categories according type of vehicles which previously all vehicles in Singapore must bear prefix S due to previous standardization with Peninsular Malaysia according to geographical location (A is for Perak, B is for Selangor, S is for Singapore/Sabah), motorbikes with A and goods vehicles under 3 tonnes with Y. E was followed by EA, EB with the letters EC in 1973 up to EZ. E was chosen then as letters A-D were already in used by other states in Malaysia. 

From 1984, the "S" series of number plates was launched again after EZ, but now with two serial suffix letters, starting from SBA, although with several prefixes being skipped as they are reserved, such as SBS and SMB, as they were used for buses that belong to public transport operators. However under the Bus Contracting Model which was later implemented, bus operators under Bus Contracting Model utilise the SG prefix for all public buses.

Since August 2017, the Land Transport Authority announced that electric bicycle owners will have to register their personal mobility (i.e. bicycles and others alike) vehicles between 14 August and 31 January 2018 and install number plates, with sealing and registration to be done by the individual. Since then, if the unregistered PAB already has an LTA orange seal, a registration is only needed. Alternatively, if a registered PAB is bought from a retailer, only a transfer the registration to the individual's name is needed.

Other classes of vehicles have registration numbers beginning with specific letters:

Other specific vehicle types
In addition, the following are controlled for specific types of vehicles, including:

CSS: City Shuttle Service buses (no longer issued: some re-registered under TIB series while the rest were deregistered.)
LTA: Land Transport Authority enforcement officers' vehicles. 
MID: Singapore Armed Forces vehicles (this is a suffix with up to five digits before it, e.g., "12345 MID"). "MID" originally stood for the Ministry of Interior and Defence. General ranks in the armed forces are provided with staff cars with two-digit MID plates.
MP: Vehicles operated by the Singapore Armed Forces Military Police Command. (SAFPU plates were formerly used)
NZ: Vehicles of New Zealand diplomats and Installations Auxiliary Police Force (ANZUK).
PU: Tax-exempt, restricted for exclusive use with permission on the island of Pulau Ubin
QX: Emergency and law enforcement agencies (Singapore Police Force, Singapore Civil Defence Force, Immigration and Checkpoints Authority, etc.)
QY: Quasi-government agencies and statutory boards
RD: Research and development vehicles (such as electric, fuel-cell and smart car rental vehicles). 
RU: Restricted Use vehicles, a special category for vehicles for which road taxes are not paid. A vehicle with such a licence is restricted for use within certain areas, for example a pushback truck within the grounds of Singapore Changi Airport or shuttle buses on Sentosa island and other southern islands of Singapore. When travelling out of the restricted boundaries, such vehicles are either required to be tagged with a trade-plate or towed.
S/CC: Vehicles of the Consular Corps
S/CD: Vehicles of the Diplomatic Corps
S/TE: "Technical employment" vehicles
S1 to S10: State cars used for ferrying official government guests and dignitaries
SBS: Buses operated by SBS Transit (from 1973) until January 2016. Currently also used by Tower Transit and Go-Ahead Singapore.
SDC: Buses operated by Sentosa Development Corporation (No longer issued, replaced by RU plates)
SEP: "Singapore Elected President" – the official state car of the President of the Republic of Singapore (1 SEP)
SG: Government-owned buses operated by contracted bus operators under Bus Contracting Model. Formerly assigned to goods vehicles, most goods vehicles were de-registered by 1998.
SJ: Supreme Court judges (the Chief Justice's car has the plate number "SJ 1").
SMB: Buses operated by SMRT Buses until January 2016, used in tandem with the TIB series. Used for buses registered after the merger of TIBS and SMRT in 2004. Currently also used by Tower Transit, SBS Transit and Go-Ahead.
SP: Speaker of Parliament (SP 1)
SPF: Commissioner of Police, Singapore Police Force (SPF 1)
STC: Buses operated by Singapore Traction Company. (All deregistered, operations ceased since 1971).
SZ/SZA: Older rental vehicles and chauffeur-driven private hire cars. Since the car tax rationalisation of 1998, private hire and rental cars have been issued with standard passenger vehicle prefixes. Currently SZ prefixes are used on private boats/yachts with (a suffix with up to five digits after it with checksum).
TIB: Buses operated by SMRT Buses registered prior to the merger of Trans-Island Bus Services (TIBS) and SMRT from 1983 to 2004. The last of these buses were deregistered in January 2021, with TIB1247G, a Mercedes-Benz O405G, being the last ever TIB-registered bus to be taken off the roads.
TP: Motorcycles of the Traffic Police Department, Singapore Police Force. 
LM: Lifting machines such as crane. i.e. (LM123456A) issued by the Ministry of Manpower.
C: Construction equipment i.e.(C12ABC).

Special prefixes were used for specific events, such as:

ASN: Vehicles used by VIPs and delegates during the ASEAN Summit held in Singapore in November 2018
WTO: Vehicles used during the World Trade Organization's inaugural Ministerial Conference held in Singapore in December 1996
IOC: Vehicles used during the International Olympic Committee's 117th Session held in Singapore in July 2005
NDP: Vehicles used during the National Day Parade, 2005, on 9 August 2005
AIRSHOW: Vehicles used during Singapore Airshow
APEC: Vehicles used during the APEC Annual Meetings in November 2009.
SIWW: Vehicles used during Singapore International Water Week
WCS: Vehicles used during World Cities Summit
YOG: Vehicles used during the 2010 Summer Youth Olympics.
SEAG: Vehicles used during the 2015 Southeast Asian Games.
APG: Vehicles used during the 2015 ASEAN Para Games.
HSBC: Vehicles used during the events organised by HSBC (Hongkong and Shanghai Banking Corporation)
HWWC: Vehicles used during the HSBC Women’s World Championship (Hongkong and Shanghai Banking Corporation)
OCBC: Vehicles used by OCBC during annual cycling event. Such as OCBC Cycle yearly 
SGP (without checksum suffix): Vehicles used during the Singapore Grand Prix.
IMDEX: Vehicles used during the 2017 Maritime Defence Exhibition & Conference (IMDEX Asia 2017)
CESS: Vehicles used during the CleanEnviro Summit. 
IW: Vehicles used during the Interpol World.

They are neither used after the events nor sold for to the public, but unofficial series for cosmetic purposes.

Civil Mobilisation Exercise or Vehicle Recalls have a large A3/A2 sticker stuck at the rear and front of the vehicle denoted that the vehicle is being mobilised or deployed for civil emergency exercises. These usually happen during weekends.

Checksum
The checksum letter is calculated by converting the letters into numbers, i.e., where A=1 and Z=26, potentially giving seven individual numbers from each registration plate. However, only two letters of the prefix are used in the checksum. For a three-letter prefix, only the last two letters are used; for a two-letter prefix, both letters are used; for a single letter prefix, the single letter corresponds to the second position, with the first position as 0. For numerals less than four digits, additional zeroes are added in front as placeholders, for example "1" is "0001". SBS 9889 would therefore give 2, 19, 9, 8, 8 and 9 (note that "S" is discarded); E 12 would give 0, 5, 0, 0, 1 and 2. SG 2017 would be given as 19, 7, 2, 0, 1, 7.

Each individual number is then multiplied by 6 fixed numbers (9, 4, 5, 4, 3, 2). These are added up, then divided by 19. The remainder corresponds to one of the 19 letters used (A, Z, Y, X, U, T, S, R, P, M, L, K, J, H, G, E, D, C, B), with "A" corresponding to a remainder of 0, "Z" corresponding to 1, "Y" corresponding to 2 and so on. In the case of SBS 9889, the final letter is a "U"; for E 23, the final letter should be a H. 
SG 2017 back letter should be a C. The letters F, I, N, O, Q, V and W are not used as checksum letters.

Checksum suffix letters are not applied to special government vehicles and event vehicles.

Online Checksum Calculator

Prefix exceptions
LTA has introduced policies where certain series of licence plate prefixes are deliberately skipped for various reasons. The policies include:
SA: The SA sequence was never issued (the S-sequence in 1984 started with SBA), because the West Coast Division of Sabah state in Malaysia has been using the SA sequence.
SE, SI, SO and SU: When the SDZ series was exhausted in 2003, the SE series was skipped and the next plates issued was the SFA. LTA announced that it had adopted the policy of not issuing series with vowels in the middle of the three-letter prefixes. This was done to avoid forming objectionable word combinations such as "SEE" (resembles spelling of 'see'), "SEL" (resembles spelling of the word 'sell'), "SEX" (resembles spelling of 'sex'), "SEY" (resembles spelling of 'say'), "SIA" (resembles Singapore Airlines), "SIN" (resembles abbreviation of Singapore as well as 'sin') and "SUX" (resembles spelling of 'sucks'). After SGZ was exhausted in mid-2008, SJA was used next, since SH was already being used for taxis.
SKY: LTA has announced that since SKY also forms a meaningful word (sky), the SKY series will also be skipped despite the middle letter being a consonant. SLY has also been skipped, and similar words such as SPA and SPY will likely also be skipped in the future.
FA, FE and FU: After FZ exhausted, FBA was issued and FA series are skipped for motorcycle. This was done to avoid forming objectionable word combinations such as "FAK" (resembles spelling of 'fuck') and "FAP" (resembles spelling of 'masturbating').
GA, GE and GU: After GZ exhausted, GBA was issued and GA series are skipped for Light Good Vehicle. This was done to avoid forming objectionable word combinations such as "GAY" (resembles spelling of 'gay').
SHE: SHE also forms a meaningful word (she), the SHE series also be skipped for taxi due despite the middle letter being a consonant.

Personalised registrations
To date, vanity plates or such a scheme has not been introduced, as it would further encourage the use of private vehicles which contradicts the efforts by the state in discouraging the usage of private vehicles.

For now, there is a thriving trade in the sales of number plates that have single, double or significant digits (i.e., lucky numbers) or registration numbers from the older series. Bids for vehicle registration numbers starts at S$1,000, with the number awarded to the highest bidder. The highest amount recorded for a bid was in 2016, where the registration number of 'S32H' was sold for S$335,000.

Other colour schemes

Off-peak vehicles

Vehicles registered as "Off-peak Vehicles", colloquially known as "weekend cars" or red plate, pay a cheaper annual road tax compared to ordinary private cars, and rebates towards the registration of Certificate of Entitlement (COE) and Additional Registration Fee (ARF) on a new vehicle purchase. Off-peak vehicles display number plates with white characters on a red background and are held with a tamper seal at the corner, bolted onto the bumper beam frame or the trunk itself. They are also not to be confused with the preserved vehicle licence plate format for de-registered vehicles.

These vehicles are only allowed to run on the roads in Singapore after peak hours (7:00 pm – 7:00 am) on weekdays, and the whole day on Saturday (Revised OPC scheme allows on whole Saturday, non-revised old OPC scheme vehicles must adhered to the old scheme restriction which is 7:00 am – 3:00 pm on Saturday), Sunday and public holidays. The restrictions do not apply if the vehicle is not in Singapore and is in Malaysia during restricted hours.

If owners of off-peak vehicles wish to drive on weekdays during restricted hours, they are required to buy an e-licence for $20 either online or through major post offices. Car owners have up to 24 hours on the following day to purchase the e-licence. First-time offenders may be fined up to $5,000 for failing to display a valid day coupon or using an invalid day coupon, and up to $10,000 for using an altered day coupon when their vehicles are used during the restricted hours.

Off-peak vehicles pay a relatively lower road tax (a discount of up to $500) as compared to other private vehicles, and are also given rebate of $17,000 which can be offset against the COE and ARF. Usually dependent on each motorist usage on a daily basis, a majority of people in Singapore do not use off-peak vehicles in today’s trends due to some of its restrictions on day usage and are not beneficial financially for cars above 1600cc. Off-peak vehicles are popular among cars below 1600cc due to lower road tax rebates.

Other categories

A "Restricted Use" vehicle displays a registration plate with white letters on a diagonally bisected background, the upper half of which is red and the lower half emerald green. The two lead characters of the plate are "RU".

A "Classic Car" collector's vehicle has an ordinary registration number but with white lettering on a half-red, half-yellow background, with a seal affixed on the number plate by an authorised inspection centre.

"Hazardous Cargo" plates were introduced in 2005, using normal commercial vehicle registrations, often in the 'Y' code, but with, unusually, black figures on a reflective orange background. These trucks are permitted to carry fuel, gas canisters and chemicals (flammables), and are neither permitted to enter tunnels nor city areas unless route arrangements have been made in advance with the fire services. Malaysian lorries are also required to have a separate HAZMAT orange licence plate affixed to both the trailer and wagon (tow head). Such vehicles are subject to the same rules as Singapore-registered hazardous cargo vehicles.

"Research and Development" vehicles display a half-yellow, half-blue plate with the prefix "RD".

Motor dealers and traders use white on blue plates using the suffix "S", preceded by up to four numerals for their test drive vehicles.

Driving instructors teaching students in Singapore must display an "L" ("learner") plate beside their vehicle registration plates on both the front and back of the vehicle.

Similarities with Malaysian plates

Potential conflicts with Malaysian vehicle registration number schemes:

'A' (Perak) - SG old motorcycles prefix

'C' (Pahang) - SG company buses (CB) and City Shuttle Service buses (CSS) prefixes

MY 'E' series prefix - SG old private cars prefix

'F' (Putrajaya) - SG motorcycles prefix

MY 'G' series prefix - SG Light Goods vehicles prefix

'M' (Malacca) - SG Military Police motorcycles (MP) prefix

'P' (Penang) - SG private buses (PA-PZ) and Pulau Ubin vehicles prefixes

'Q' (Sarawak) - SG old company cars (Q), Private ambulances (QXX) and Government vehicles (QX/QY) prefixes

MY 'R' series prefix - SG Restricted Use (RU) & Research and Development vehicles (RD) prefixes

'S' (Sabah) - SG older cars (SB, SK, SQ, SS, ST) prefixes

Sabah 'SMA-SMZ' - SG 'SMA-SMZ' & SMRT buses (SMB) prefixes

MY 'SMS' - SG 'SMS' prefix

'T' (Terengganu) - SG Traffic Police motorcycles (TP) & SMRT buses (TIB) prefixes

'W' (Kuala Lumpur) - SG Rover/Jeep & Engineering Plant vehicles prefix

MY 'X' series - SG Very Heavy Goods vehicles prefix

MY 'Y' series - SG Heavy Goods vehicles prefix

References

External links

Land Transport Authority
Singapore Market Place for Car plate Numbers
Age of Singapore Car plate

Singapore transport-related lists
Singapore
Vehicles of Singapore
Road transport in Singapore